Félicie Albert is a French-born American physicist working on laser plasma accelerators. She is the deputy director for the  Center for High Energy Density Science at Lawrence Livermore National Laboratory and staff scientist at the National Ignition Facility and Photon Science Directorate and the Joint High Energy Density Sciences organization. She received BS in 2003 in engineering from Ecole Nationale Supérieure de Physique de Marseille (now Ecole Centrale de Marseille), in France, her master's degree in optics from the University of Central Florida in 2004 and her PhD from Ecole Polytechnique in 2007, before joining LLNL as a postdoctoral fellow in 2008. Her main expertise are "the generation and applications of novel sources of electrons, X-rays and gamma-rays through laser-plasma interaction, laser-wakefield acceleration and Compton scattering."

She received the Katherine E. Weimer Award from the American Physical Society in 2017, and the Presidential Early Career Award for Science and Engineers in 2019. Also in 2019, she was named a Fellow of the American Physical Society, after a nomination from the APS Division of Plasma Physics, "for many original contributions to the development of directional X-ray beams for probing high-energy-density matter".

References

External links

Year of birth missing (living people)
Living people
American women physicists
École Polytechnique alumni
Lawrence Livermore National Laboratory staff
University of Central Florida alumni
Fellows of the American Physical Society
21st-century American women
Recipients of the Presidential Early Career Award for Scientists and Engineers